Lyria kuniene is a species of sea snail, a marine gastropod mollusk in the family Volutidae, the volutes.

Description

Distribution
This marine species occurs off New Caledonia.

References

 Bouchet, P., 1979. A new volute from the western Pacific. The Veliger 22(1): 49-50

External links
 MNHN, Paris: holotype

Volutidae
Gastropods described in 1979